WWE NXT Level Up, also known as NXT Level Up (stylized as  NXT LVL UP), is an American professional wrestling streaming television program. It is produced by the American professional wrestling promotion WWE, featuring performers from the promotion's NXT brand division. It airs on Fridays at 10 p.m. Eastern Time on Peacock in the United States and the WWE Network internationally. The program features matches taped either before or after the preceding episode of NXT. The show premiered on February 18, 2022, as a replacement for 205 Live, and it goes head-to-head with AEW Rampage.

History
In October 2019, WWE's 205 Live brand merged under the NXT brand with the 205 Live streaming television show becoming a supplementary show of NXT. On February 15, 2022, WWE announced that 205 Live would be replaced by a new show called NXT Level Up, which would stream in 205 Lives former Friday night slot at 10 pm Eastern Time on Peacock in the United States and the WWE Network in international markets. The show premiered on February 18, 2022. The commentators for the show are Blake Howard and Byron Saxton, and the ring announcers are Alicia Taylor and Kelly Kincaid. In the main event of the inaugural episode, Edris Enofé defeated Kushida.

Broadcast history

On-air personalities

Commentators

Ring announcers

References

External links

Level Up
2022 American television series debuts
2022 web series debuts
2020s American television series
NXT Level Up
NXT Level Up
American non-fiction web series